The 1906 Circuit des Ardennes was a Grand Prix motor race held at the 53.5 mile Bastogne circuit on 13 August 1906.

Classification

References

Ardennes
Ardennes Circuit
Sport in Bastogne